Aleksander Dzierzbicki was a Polish szlachcic (nobleman), a  of Inowłódz (1752–1759), a  (1759), a  (1759–1763) and a castellan of Brzeziny (1763–1767).

Footnotes

References 

Polish nobility
Secular senators of the Polish–Lithuanian Commonwealth